Warrington Rylands 1906 Football Club is a football club based in Warrington, England.

History
The club was founded as Rylands F.C. in 1906 as a works team from a manufacturer of wire. The club started playing in the Liverpool County Football Combination league and then joining the Warrington & District Football League. The club had to wait until 1928 before winning their first Silverware, the Depot Cup. The 1950s saw the club became champions of the Warrington & District Football League Premier Division 6 times in a row, commencing from the 1953–54 season.

The 1968–69 season saw the club join the Mid-Cheshire League. The 1980–81 season saw the club finish as champions of the league, as well as make their debut in the FA Vase. The club collected another league championship trophy in the 1983–84 season. In 2008 the club merged with fellow Mid Cheshire league side Crossfields F.C. becoming Crossfields/Rylands F.C. After two seasons, the club reverted to Rylands F.C.

On 15 July 2016, Wayne Rooney's agent Paul Stretford stated he is aiming to get Rylands to the Football League after investing £100,000 on ground improvements. On 2 April 2018 the club published a letter from Paul Stretford which confirmed his proposed takeover will proceed, subject to due diligence. The 2018–19 season saw the club move to Division one south of the North West Counties Football League, and winning it at the first attempt, so gaining promotion to the Premier Division. In the 2019–20 season the club took part in their first-ever FA Cup qualifying campaign.

The club announced a name change in August 2020 to Warrington Rylands 1906 FC to reflect their locality.

Ground

The club play their home games at Gorsey Lane. Floodlights were added to the ground at the start of 2019.

Honours
Northern Premier League
 Division One West Champions (1) 2021-22
North West Counties Football League
 Premier League Promotion (1) 2020-21
 Division One South Champions (1) 2018–19
 First Division Champions Cup (1) 2018–19
FA Vase
 Winners (1) 2020–21
Mid-Cheshire League
 League champions (2) 1980–81, 1983–84
 League Cup (1) 1978–79
Warrington & District Football League
 Premier Division Champions (6) 1953–54, 1954–55, 1955–56, 1956–57, 1957–58, 1958–59
 Depot Cup (1) 1927–28
Warrington Guardian Cup
 Winners (5) 1957–58, 1966–67, 1971–72, 1972–73, 2014–15
Liverpool Challenge Cup
 Winners (1) 1957–58
Starkey Cup
 Winners (1) 1952–53

References

External links

Football clubs in England
Cheshire Association Football League
North West Counties Football League clubs
Association football clubs established in 1906
1906 establishments in England
Northern Premier League clubs